HMS Hampton Court was a 70-gun third rate ship of the line of the Royal Navy, launched at Deptford Dockyard in 1678. Her initial commission was to move her to Chatham where she spent in the next ten years in Ordinary. She held an active commission for the War of the English Succession, participating in the Battles of Beachy Head and Barfleur. She was rebuilt at Blackwall in 1699/1701. During the War of Spanish Succession she served mainly in the Mediterranean. In 1707 she was taken by the French and incorporated into the French Navy for four years. She was sold to the Spanish in 1712. She was wrecked in Spanish service off the coast of Florida in a hurricane in 1715.

This was the first vessel to bear the name Hampton Court in the English and Royal Navy.

HMS Hampton Court was awarded the Battle Honours Barfleur 1692 and Marbella 1705.

Construction and Specifications
She was ordered in April 1677 to be built at Deptford Dockyard under the guidance of Master Shipwright Jonas Shish. Her keel was laid in 1677 and launched 10 July 1678. Her builder's measure tonnage was calculated as 1,036 tons (burthen).

Her initial gun armament was in accordance with the 1677 Establishment with 70/62 guns consisting of twenty-six demi-cannons (54 cwt, 9.5 ft) on the lower deck, twenty-four 12-pounder guns (32 cwt, 9 ft) on the upper deck, ten sakers (16 cwt, 7 ft) on the quarterdeck and four sakers (16 cwt, 7 ft) on the foc’x’le with four 3-pounder guns (5 cwt, 5 ft) on the poop deck or roundhouse. Their initial manning establishment would be for a crew of 460/380/300 personnel. By 1688 she would carry 70 guns as per the 1685 Establishment, however, the demi-culverins replaced the 12-pounders on the upper deck. In 1696 she would still carry 70 guns consisting of twenty-two demi-cannons, four culverins, twenty-four demi-culverins, sixteen sakers, and four 3-pounder guns.

Commissioned Service

Service 1678 to 1699
She was commissioned on 9 May 1678 under the command of Captain John Kirke until 17 May 1678 for transport to Chatham where she was placed in Ordinary. In November 1688 she was commissioned under Captain Henry Priestman during the abdication of James II and arrival of William III and Mary II. In 1689 she was under Captain John Munden as Flagship of Rear-Admiral Lord John Berkeley sailing with the Fleet. Captain John Layton held command from 1690 until his death on 2 January 1691. She was at the Battle of Beachy Head in Centre (Red) Squadron on 30 May 1690. During 1691 thru 1694 she was under command of Captain John Graydon. She fought in the Battle of Barfleur as a member of Centre (Red) Squadron, Centre Division between 19 and 22 June 1692. Captain Henry Robinson was in command during 1696/97 sailing with the Fleet. She would be rebuilt at Blackwall in 1699/1701.

Rebuild at Blackwall 1699-1701
She was ordered on 27 September 1699 to be rebuilt under contract by Henry Johnson of Blackwall. She was launched/completed in 1701. Her builder's measure tonnage was calculated as 1,07371/94 tons.

She probably retained her armament as stated in the 1685 Establishment, though it is unclear if her armament was changed to the 1703 Establishment later. It is known that when completed her gun armament total at least 70 guns.

Service 1702 to 1707
She was commissioned in 1702 under the command of Captain Charles Wager. He would remain in command until 1706. In July 1702 she escorted a North Sea convoy. By October she was with Admiral Sir Cloudisley Shovell's Fleet. In 1703 she went to the Mediterranean with Shovell's Fleet. On 10 March 1705 she was at the Battle of Marbella as a member of Vice-Admiral Sir John Leake's Fleet. This was the final attempt by the French to capture Gibraltar from the English. Admiral Leake won a crushing victory over the French as all five ships of the line were either captured or destroyed. Later in 1705 she was detached to Rear-Admiral Thomas Dilke's Squadron while remaining in the Mediterranean. She was at Alicante, Spain (on the south-east coast of Spain). In 1707 she was under the command of Captain George Clements at Barcelona, Spain.

Loss
Hampton Court was captured in the action of 2 May 1707 by Forbin's squadron off Brighton (Beachy Head). She was incorporated into the French Navy and served from 1707 until 1711. She was sold to the Spanish at Dunkirk in 1712 and renamed Capitaine. The ship met her demise as a flagship of the ill-fated 1715 Treasure Fleet that was wrecked by a hurricane on the Florida Treasure Coast.

See also
List of ships captured in the 18th century

Notes

Citations

References

 Colledge (2020), Ships of the Royal Navy, by J.J. Colledge, revised and updated by Lt Cdr Ben Warlow and Steve Bush, published by Seaforth Publishing, Barnsley, Great Britain, © 2020,  (EPUB), Section K (Kent)
 Winfield (2009), British Warships in the Age of Sail (1603 – 1714), by Rif Winfield, published by Seaforth Publishing, England © 2009, EPUB 
 Lavery, Brian (2003) The Ship of the Line - Volume 1: The Development of the Battlefleet 1650-1850. Conway Maritime Press. 
 Clowes (1898), The Royal Navy, A History from the Earliest Times to the Present (Vol. II). London. England: Sampson Low, Marston & Company, © 1898
 Thomas (1998), Battles and Honours of the Royal Navy, by David A. Thomas, first published in Great Britain by Leo Cooper 1998, Copyright © David A. Thomas 1998,  (EPUB)

Ships of the line of the Royal Navy
1670s ships
Ships built in Deptford
Ships built by the Blackwall Yard